"Feel the Need in Me" is a song written by Abrim Tilmon, a member of the American R&B/soul vocal group the Detroit Emeralds. It was released as a single by the group in October 1972 on the Westbound label. It reached number 4 on the UK Singles Chart, number 22 on the R&B chart, and number 110 on the Billboard pop chart.  The song was featured on their 1972 album You Want It, You Got It.

The group re-recorded the song and re-released a disco version in 1977 as "Feel the Need". This version reached number 12 on the UK Singles Chart, number 14 on the U.S. dance chart, number 73 on the R&B chart, and number 90 on the Billboard pop chart. It was featured on their 1973 album Feel the Need and has appeared on many other compilation albums since.

The song was produced by Katouzzion and arranged by Abrim Tilmon and Johnny Allen.

Other charting versions
Graham Central Station released a funk version of the song as a single entitled "Feel the Need" in 1975 which reached number 18 on the R&B chart and number 53 on the UK Singles chart.
Leif Garrett released a version of the song as a single entitled "Feel the Need" in 1979, which reached number 38 on the UK Singles chart and number 57 on the Billboard pop chart.
Forrest released a version of the song as a single in 1983, which reached number 17 on the UK Singles chart.
Shakin' Stevens released a version of the song as a single in 1988, which reached number 26 on the UK Singles chart.
G Nation featuring Rosie released a version of the song as a single in 1997, which reached number 58 on the UK Singles chart.

Other versions
Genya Ravan released a version of the song as a single in 1975.
Bryan Ferry released a version of the song on his 1985 Windswept EP.
Albert King released a version of the song on his 1992 album, The Blues Don't Change which is a re-release of his 1977 album, The Pinch.

References

1972 songs
1972 singles
1975 singles
1977 singles
1979 singles
1983 singles
1988 singles
1997 singles
The Detroit Emeralds songs
Leif Garrett songs
Forrest (singer) songs
Bryan Ferry songs
Albert King songs
Scotti Brothers Records singles
De-Lite Records singles
Shakin' Stevens songs